Jose Sixto Raphael Gonzalez Dantes III (born August 2, 1980), professionally known as Dingdong Dantes, is a Filipino actor, television presenter, dancer, commercial model and film producer who is currently working as an exclusive talent of GMA Network. He is also the founding chairman of the YesPinoy Foundation and manages his own film studio named AgostoDos Pictures.

Life and career

Early years
Jose Sixto Raphael Gonzalez Dantes III was born in Quezon City, Philippines. He began his career as a child model at the age of two, appearing in a television advertisement for Carnation milk. Several other commercials ensued before he joined an all-male dance group called Abztract Dancers, with his friend, actor Nathan Dados, and his cousin, actor Arthur Solinap. Their group became regulars on Eat Bulaga! and That's Entertainment.

As an actor, his first movie appearance was in the Shake, Rattle and Roll V episode "Anino". After three years, he debuted on GMA Network's youth-oriented T.G.I.S. when he was 17, under the name Raphael Dantes playing the role of Iñaki. He was first paired with Antoinette Taus. Dantes and Taus became one of the most memorable loveteams in Philippine entertainment industry, especially in the 90's. He appeared in films like Honey My Love So Sweet, Kiss Mo 'Ko and I'm Sorry My Love, and television programmes including Anna Karenina, and did a few guesting stints on ABS-CBN such as a F.L.A.M.E.S. episode, a youth-oriented romantic-drama anthology with different love teams and stories that aired from 1996 to 2000.

2000s
In 2000, Dantes appeared in the sitcom Super Klenk. In 2001, he was paired with actress Tanya García as they top-billed GMA-7's primetime soap opera series Sana ay Ikaw na Nga. The two headlined in another primetime romance-drama billing in 2003 titled Twin Hearts. He took on several hosting jobs including beauty pageants such as Binibining Pilipinas and GMA Network's reality artist search, StarStruck, and the game show Family Feud before its transfer to Edu Manzano. Aside from his television stints, he also appeared in films including Magkapatid and Pangarap Ko Ang Ibigin Ka. He hosts the suspense-thriller Wag Kukurap, occasionally directing. He played King Ybrahim/Ybarro in the Encantadia fantasy-themed television saga and the 2006 film Moments of Love.

In 2007, Dantes portrayed the lead role Sergio to Marian Rivera's character, Marimar in Marimar. During the same year, he was named No. 1 Bachelor of 2007 by Cosmopolitan magazine (Philippines). He won the USTV Students’ Choice Award for "Most Popular Actor in a Drama/Mini-series."

In 2008, he was cast by his home studio to play the role of Fredo, a love interest of Dyesebel in Dyesebel. In March 2008, he debuted as the Bench image model. Also in 2008, Dantes starred in One True Love. The Cinema Evaluation Board of the Philippines rated the film a B.

In early 2009, Dantes appeared on Ang Babaeng Hinugot sa Aking Tadyang. He was chosen as Myx guest VJ in August 2009 to promote his album The Dingdong Dantes Experience. The album turned gold one week after it was released on the variety show SOP. Dantes was chosen to portray the role of "Cholo" in the 2009 Philippine adaptation of the Korean drama Stairway to Heaven. He also replaced Richard Gomez as the new host for Family Feud.

2010s
In 2010, Dantes was scheduled to release You to Me Are Everything. He was part of Regine Velasquez and Ogie Alcasid's U.S. tour mid May–June. He appeared in the television show Endless Love from June 25 to October 15, 2010. Dantes became a cohost of Party Pilipinas on channel 7. He won the "Best Drama Actor Award" for Stairway To Heaven in the 2010 PMPC Star Awards for TV and was nominated for the same category at the 2010 Asian Television Awards.

In 2011, Dantes did a comedy primetime TV series titled, I Heart You, Pare! with his leading lady Regine Velasquez. He plays an obnoxious macho guy who falls with a heterosexual woman played by Velásquez who, after a chance encounter, met again as she plays a drag who tries to run away from the law. Unfortunately Regine Velasquez left seven weeks before the series came to a close due to her pregnancy with husband Ogie Alcasid. Iza Calzado replaced Velasquez in the series.

He was part of the Star Cinema suspense film Segunda Mano with Kris Aquino and Angelica Panganiban. This marked Dantes' first project with rival station and film archive Star Cinema, a division of ABS-CBN. It was also his first time to work with Kapamilya stars. He stated that he signed a one-film contract with Star Cinema to do the film and work with Kris Aquino.

He did a primetime TV series, My Beloved which aired on February 13, 2012. In June 2012, he was chosen to star in another MMFF Entry for 2012 in the film One More Try starring Kapamilya actors Angelica Panganiban, Angel Locsin and Zanjoe Marudo. It was Dante's second film with rival Star Cinema of ABS-CBN and was a comeback for Ruel S. Bayani after his critically acclaimed successful blockbuster film No Other Woman hit the box-office last year. In November 2012, Dantes was set in a primetime TV series Pahiram ng Sandali with Lorna Tolentino, Christopher de Leon and Max Collins.

In 2013, Dantes and Marian Rivera joined PETA in their campaign to free the elephant Mali from the Manila Zoo, where she has been kept for the majority of her life alone in a tiny enclosure and in need of proper care.

In March 2014, Dantes graduated from West Negros University with a Bachelor of Science in Business Administration Major in Marketing Management. On May 5, 2014, Dantes was appointed and sworn-in by President Benigno Aquino III as commissioner-at-large of the National Youth Commission. Two years later, he decided to resign as the NYC commissioner to give way for his endorsement for Grace Poe as president and Leni Robredo as vice president in the 2016 national elections.

In April 2017, he visited Calapan, Oriental Mindoro to inaugurate the Mindoro State College of Agriculture and Technology (MinSCAT) Grandstand. A day later, he became the guest speaker during the 43rd Commencement Exercises of Mindoro State College of Agriculture and Technology-Calapan Campus.

He is currently the chief operating officer of Hyundai West Parañaque.

2020s
Dantes appeared in a Philippine adaptation of Descendants of the Sun from South Korean TV series of his role Capt. Lucas Manalo, together with Jennylyn Mercado.

Personal life
Dantes proposed for the second time to his perennial leading lady and longtime girlfriend, Marian Rivera, on the Marian dance show on August 9, 2014. They met on the set of Marimar in 2007. His first proposal was in Macau in August 2012.

On December 30, 2014, Dantes married Rivera in the Immaculate Conception Cathedral, Cubao, Quezon City. Both Dantes and Rivera are exclusive artists of GMA Network. After years of hard work and proven successes of their television projects, both individually or together, GMA gave them the honor of the title as their network's primetime king and queen. Thus, their wedding was given the title "The Royal Wedding". They announced an expected first child in April 2015; Rivera gave birth to Maria Letizia on November 23, 2015, and later gave birth to their second child Jose Sixto IV (Ziggy) on April 16, 2019.

Dantes is also a Lieutenant Commander in the Philippine Navy.

He is the cousin of fellow actors Carlo Gonzales, Arthur Solinap, and also the cousin of former sports anchor and current TV host Bianca Gonzales-Intal.

Filmography

Film

Television

Television series

Television shows

Drama anthologies

TV specials

Discography

Albums

Awards and recognitions

Film awards and nominations

Television awards and nominations

Special awards

Entertainment awards

Notes

References

External links
Dingdong Dantes at GMANetwork.com

Living people
1980 births
Ateneo de Manila University alumni
Filipino male child actors
Filipino male television actors
Filipino television variety show hosts
Filipino game show hosts
Filipino television directors
Filipino male models
People from Quezon City
Male actors from Metro Manila
Filipino civil servants
Benigno Aquino III administration personnel
GMA Network personalities
Viva Artists Agency
Filipino Roman Catholics
Visayan people
Filipino male film actors